is a passenger railway station located in the city of Takamatsu, Kagawa, Japan.  It is operated by the private transportation company Takamatsu-Kotohira Electric Railroad (Kotoden) and is designated station "S09".

Lines
Rokumanji Station is a station of the Kotoden Shido Line and is located 7.8 km from the opposing terminus of the line at Kawaramachi Station].

Layout
The station consists of one side platform serving a single bi-directional track. The station is unattended.

Adjacent stations

History
Rokumanji Station opened on November 18, 1911 on the Tosan Electric Tramway. It became a station of the Sanuki Electric Railway in 1942. On November 1, 1943 it became a station on the Takamatsu-Kotohira Electric Railway. Operations were suspended on January 26, 1945, but were reopened on October 9, 1949 with the station renamed . The name reverted to Rokumanji Station on February 1, 1955.

Passenger statistics

Surrounding area
Kagawa Prefectural Takamatsu Kita Junior and Senior High School

See also
 List of railway stations in Japan

References

External links

  

Railway stations in Japan opened in 1911
Railway stations in Takamatsu